The Château de Bollwiller is a château in the commune of Bollwiller, in the department of Haut-Rhin, Alsace, France. Dated to 1589, it became a Monument historique in 2007.

References

Châteaux in Haut-Rhin
Monuments historiques of Haut-Rhin